K58 may refer to:

 K-58 (Kansas highway)
 K-58 trailer, an American military trailer
 , a corvette of the Free French Navy